There are several lighthouses in the U.S. state of Texas, including several listed on the National Register of Historic Places. Not every lighthouse in Texas is listed here as some have very little information known about them. Saluria, and Swash lights for example were built right before the civil war and were both destroyed by confederate forces.

Faux Lighthouses

References

 
Lighthouses
Texas
Lighthouses